"Junebug" is a song recorded by American singer-songwriter Robert Francis. The song was released on 2009 through Atlantic Records, as the lead single from his second studio album, Before Nightfall (2009).

Background
Prior to recording his major label debut, Before Nightfall, Francis had a five-year relationship fall apart. "Junebug" was written about the affair, with Francis remarking, "It goes into a lot more explicit detail than a lot of other songs about how tumultuous [it] was." He told Redefine magazine that the theme of the song was the "dissipation of a relationship," noting that most of the Before Nightfall album is similarly about "growing apart from the person you love."

The song was first released for digital download and was made iTunes' Single of the Week for the week of October 11, 2009. Francis promoted the song with appearances on Last Call with Carson Daly and The Tonight Show with Jay Leno.

Commercial performance
It was one of the top ten commercial airplay hits across Europe during the summer of 2010, alongside singles by Train, Owl City and Katy Perry. It debuted at number 11 on June 26, 2010, peaking at number eight on July 10. It performed best in France, where it reached number one. It was purported to be the second best-selling single in France for 2010.

"Junebug" is Francis' best-performing single. Its success contributed to his decision to part ways with major label Atlantic Records. In a later interview, he remarked:

Track listing 
 Digital download
 "Junebug" – 3:56
 "Mescaline" (Paris Sessions) – 5:02

 Digital download – Extended play
 "Junebug" – 3:56
 "Mescaline" (Paris Sessions) – 5:02
 "Wild Horses" (Paris Sessions) – 5:00

 7" vinyl
 "Junebug" – 3:56
 "Nightfall" – 3:25
 "Try" - 4:02

Personnel
Credits adapted from the 7" single sleeve.
 Robert Francis – vocals, songwriting, guitar, acoustic guitar, ARP String Ensemble
 Carla Commagere – backing vocals
 Alex Kweskin – bass guitar
 Richard Gowen – drums
 Graham Lathrop – guitar
 Bill Silva – management
 Dave Sardy – record producer, mixing, piano, percussion
 Stephen Marcussen – mastering engineer

Charts

References

External links
 

2010 singles
2009 songs
Song recordings produced by Dave Sardy